The capped wheatear (Oenanthe pileata) is a small insectivorous passerine bird that was formerly classed as a member of the thrush family Turdidae, but is now more generally considered to be an Old World flycatcher, Muscicapidae.

Description
The capped wheatear is 17–18 cm long and weighs 32 g. Its legs and pointed bill are black. This common species is striking and unmistakable in appearance. The adult has a black cap, cheeks and breast band, and white eye stripe and throat. The rest of the underparts are white with buff on the flanks and lower belly. Like other wheatears, it has a distinctive tail pattern with a black feathers on the base and centre of the tail forming an inverted T against the otherwise white rump. The juvenile has a brown cap and cheeks, and the breast band is weak and diffuse. However, the breast band, larger size, and white at the base of the outer tail feathers distinguish it from the migrant northern wheatear, which is rare over most of the capped wheatear's range.

Distribution and habitat
This wheatear is found in open dry sandy and stony habitats and short grassland with a few bushes and termite mounds in Africa, from Kenya and Angola south to the Cape. It is largely non-migratory, but undertakes seasonal movements.

Behaviour
The capped wheatear's song is a loud melodic warble interspersed with slurred chattering, and it has a chik-chik alarm call. It is monogamous and builds a nest of straw, grass, and leaves in a hole in the ground or a termite mound. It may use man-made drainage pipes if available. Typically three or four, sometimes more, eggs are laid. This solitary species feeds on insects, especially ants. Like other wheatears, it perches on mounds and hops over the short grass, or flies low over the ground.

References

Ian Sinclair, Phil Hockey and Warwick Tarboton, SASOL Birds of Southern Africa (Struik 2002)

External links
 Capped wheatear - Species text in The Atlas of Southern African Birds.

capped wheatear
Birds of Sub-Saharan Africa
capped wheatear
capped wheatear